The Djemi Djema mine is a large mine located in Tébessa Province. Djemi Djema represents one of the largest phosphates reserve in Algeria having estimated reserves of 620 million tonnes of ore grading 12% P2O5.

References 

Phosphate mines in Algeria